The Fula language (Pulaar, or Pular) is written primarily in the Latin script, but in some areas is still written in an older Arabic script called the Ajami script or in the recently invented Adlam script.

Latin-based alphabets

Background

The Latin script was introduced to Fula-speaking regions of West and Central Africa by Europeans during, and in some cases immediately before, invasion. Various people — missionaries, colonial administrators, and scholarly researchers — devised various ways of writing . One issue similar to other efforts by Europeans to use their alphabet and home orthographic conventions was how to write African languages with unfamiliar sounds. In the case of Fula, these included how to represent sounds such as the implosive b and d, the ejective y, the velar n (the latter being present in European languages, but never in initial position), prenasalised consonants, and long vowels, all of which can change meaning.

Major influences on the current forms used for writing Fula were decisions made by colonial administrators in Northern Nigeria  and the Africa Alphabet. Post independence African governments decided to retain the Latin alphabet as the basis for transcribing their languages. Various writers in Fula, such as Amadou Hampate Ba and Alfa Ibrahim Sow, wrote and published in this script.

Major UNESCO-sponsored conferences on harmonising Latin-based African language orthographies in Bamako in 1966 and Niamey in 1978 confirmed standards for writing Fula. Nevertheless, orthographies for the language and its variants are determined at the country level. So while Fula writing uses basically the same character sets and rules across the region, there are some minor variations.

Orthography

Some general rules:
Vowels
Long vowels are doubled
Two different vowels are never used together
Consonants
To accentuate a consonant, double the consonant (or write ⟨'⟩ before the consonant; e.g., "temmeere" = "te'meere".)

Alphabets by country

Senegal, The Gambia, Mauritania
 a, aa, b, mb, ɓ, c, d, nd, ɗ, e, ee, f, g, ng, h, i, ii, j, nj, k, l, m, n, ŋ, ñ, o, oo, p, r, s, t, u, uu, w, x, y, ƴ

Guinea 
 a, b, ɓ, nb, c, d, ɗ, e, f, g, ɠ, ng, h, i, j, nj, k, l, m, n, ɲ, ŋ, o, p, r, s, t, u, w, y, ƴ
Prior to adoption of this system in 1989, the Guinean languages alphabet was used. This was based on the simple Latin alphabet with digraphs for the sounds particular to Pular, and is still used by some Pular speakers (in part because it can be typed using commercial keyboards). The character equivalents include: bh = ɓ ; dh = ɗ ; q = ɠ ; ny = ɲ (the French digraph gn is also used); nh = ŋ ; yh = ƴ. The old system also included: ty = c ; dy = j.

Guinea-Bissau, Sierra Leone, Liberia 
 a, b, ɓ, c, d, ɗ, e, f, g, h, i, j, k, l, m, mb, n, nd, ng, nj, ŋ, ñ, o, p, r, s, t, u, w, y, ƴ,

Mali, Burkina Faso
 a, aa, b, mb, ɓ, c, d, nd, ɗ, e, ee, f, g, ng, h, i, ii, j, nj, k, l, m, n, ŋ, ɲ, o, oo, p, r, s, t, u, uu, w, x, y, ƴ

Niger, Cameroon, Chad, Central African Republic 
 a, aa, b, mb, ɓ, c, d, nd, ɗ, e, ee, f, g, ng, h, i, ii, j, nj, k, l, m, n, ŋ, ny, o, oo, p, r, s, t, u, uu, w, x, y, ƴ

Nigeria 

 a, aa, b, mb, ɓ, c, d, nd, ɗ, e, ee, f, g, ng, h, i, ii, j, nj, k, l, m, n, ny, o, oo, p, r, s, t, u, uu, w, x, y, y

Arabic (Ajami) alphabet
The Arabic script was introduced into the West African Sahel with Islam several centuries before European colonization. As was the case with other languages such as Hausa, Muslim Fulas who went through Koranic education adapted the script to writing their language. This practice, while never formally standardized, followed some patterns of customary use in various regions. These usages differ on some details, mainly on how to represent certain consonants and vowels not present in the Arabic language.

Adlam script

During the late 1980s an alphabetic script was devised by the teenaged brothers Ibrahima and Abdoulaye Barry, in order to represent the Fulani language.  After several years of development it started to be widely adopted among Fulani communities, and is currently taught in Guinea, Nigeria, Liberia and other nearby countries. The name adlam is an acronym derived from the first four letters of the alphabet (A, D, L, M), standing for Alkule Dandayɗe Leñol Mulugol ("the alphabet that protects the peoples from vanishing").
There are Android apps to send SMS in adlam and to learn the alphabet. On computers running Microsoft Windows, the adlam script is natively supported as part of the upcoming feature update of Windows 10 version 1903 (codenamed 19H1) build 18252.

Unicode

The extended Latin characters used in the Latin transcription of Fula were incorporated since an early version of the Unicode Standard. At least some of the extended Arabic characters used in Ajami are also in the Unicode standard. The Adlam alphabet was added to the Unicode Standard in June 2016 with the release of version 9.0.

Other scripts
There has been at least one effort to adapt the N'Ko alphabet to the Pular language of Guinea. In the late 1960s, David Dalby recorded two additional scripts- the Dita script created by Oumar Dembélé (or Dambele) of Bamako, and another script created by Adama Ba. Dita was influenced by the traditional iconography of various Malian communities, while Ba's system is a cursive script which Dalby compares to the handwritten Latin alphabet.  Both scripts were alphabetic in nature, and in the face of disapproval from officials who favored the promotion of Latin-script literacy, neither had seen widespread adoption as of 1969.

References

Fula language
Latin alphabets
Arabic alphabets
Orthographies by language
Writing systems of Africa